The flag of Mari El, a federal subject and republic in the Russian Federation, was adopted by the Parliament of Mari El on 1 June 2011.

Description
The Flag of Mari El is a rectangular cloth with a width to length ratio of 2:3, divided horizontally into three bands: upper - blue, medium - white, bottom - dark red, in the ratio 3:4:3. In the white stripe a dark red Mari cross is placed, with a height of 1 / 3 the height of the flag.

The symbol of the flag is a bear. The crown and the sword on the flag symbolizes nationhood and power, respectively. The base of the emblem is a shield which contains a sign which was there on the previous flag.

Previous flags
Within the Russian Soviet Federative Socialist Republic, the flag adorned the Russian SFSR flag with the republic's name on the bottom.

From 1992 to 2006, Mari El used a different flag. This flag had the horizontal bars in the ration 1:2:1, and below the Mari cross the republic's name was written.

Proposed flags

References
Flags of the World: Flags of Mari El

Culture of Mari El
Flags of the federal subjects of Russia
Mari El
Mari El
Mari El